A river island is any exposed land surrounded by river water. Properly defined it excludes shoals between seasonally varying flows and may exclude semi-coastal islands such as in deltas.

These islands result from changes in the course of a river. Such changes may be caused by interactions with a tributary, or by the opposing fluvial actions of deposition and/or erosion that form a natural cut and meander. Nascent vegetation-free shoals and mudflats may dissipate and shift or build up into such islands through deposition; the process may be assisted through artificial reinforcement or natural factors, such as reeds, palms, evergreen trees or willows, that act as obstacles or erosion barriers, so that water flows around them. Islands may be small or large, covering many square kilometers, examples of which are given below.



Regional nomenclature 

The term "towhead" implies an islet (small island) or shoal within a river (most often the Mississippi River) having a grouping or thicket of trees, and is often used in the Midwestern United States. Many rivers, if wide enough, can house considerably large islands. The term "towhead" was popularised by Mark Twain's Adventures of Huckleberry Finn.

In England, a river island in the Thames is referred to as an "ait" (or "eyot").

Largest and smallest 

However, the Bananal island is not considered a riverine island by some geologists, as they consider the Araguaia river to form two distributaries, and Bananal island to be the landmass between these two distributed rivers. This is the reason why Majuli is considered the largest River Island. Yet, the Bananal island does not touch the main landmass at any point. Thus the confusion remains.

Umananda also lies in the Brahmaputra River. Many as tiny as Umananda or smaller, inhabited, exist in the Amazon Basin and Bangladesh. Another island of comparable size to Umananda, Hatfield Island in the Guyandotte River in the U.S. state of West Virginia, has no permanent population, but contains several permanent buildings, namely the K–12 schools serving the city of Logan and its surrounding area plus the main branch of the Logan County public library.

On canalised rivers, such as the Thames and the Seine, one-home islands exist, containing houses constructed of permanent materials. Canals reduce erosion of the islands and in particular limit the height of flash flooding by maintaining substantial "heads" of water through barrages. One-home islands improved by river canals include Monkey, Friday, Holm and D'Oyly Carte islands.

Lists of river islands

River islands by area 

 Note: Includes some river islands that also have an ocean coast.

Most populous river islands 
This list ranks river islands with a population of at least 25,000.

See also

Notes

References 

Geomorphology
Islands by type
Fluvial landforms